Robert Goldstein may refer to:
 Robert Goldstein (producer) (died 1974), American film producer 
 Robert Goldstein, producer and writer of the 1917 film The Spirit of '76
 Robert J. Goldstein, American conspirator

See also
 Bobb Goldsteinn, American showman, songwriter and musician